Odd Abrahamsen (20 May 1924 – 23 June 2001) was a Norwegian poet. He was born in Fredrikstad.

Among his collections are Om det finnes en stillhet (1962), Nedslag (1971) and Makten skal tie (1944).

He was awarded the Riksmål Society Literature Prize in 1983. He received the Fritt Ord Honorary Award for his poetical contributions for the Baltic countries.

References

20th-century Norwegian poets
Norwegian male poets
People from Fredrikstad
1924 births
2001 deaths
20th-century Norwegian male writers